Edenbower is an unincorporated community located in Douglas County, Oregon. Edenbower tried to incorporate in the 1960's.

References

Unincorporated communities in Douglas County, Oregon
Unincorporated communities in Oregon